Tobruk was a  cargo ship which was built in 1941 as Empire Builder by William Gray & Company Ltd for the  Ministry of War Transport (MoWT). On completion she was handed over to the Polish government-in-exile (along with four others; Narwik, Bałtyk, Białystok and Borysław, which in 1950 was renamed to Bytom) and renamed Tobruk. She was a member of a number of convoys during the Second World War. She was sold in 1951 to Polskie Linie Oceaniczne and served until 1967. She was scrapped in 1968.

Description
Empire Builder was built by William Gray & Sons Ltd, West Hartlepool. She was yard number 1123. Empire Builder was launched on 19 November 1941 and completed in January 1942.

The engine was built by Central Marine Engine Works, West Hartlepool. It could propel her at  Empire Builder was listed on Lloyds Register as having a GRT of 7,090 and a NRT of 5,050. Tobruk was listed on Lloyds Register as having a GRT of 7,048 and a NRT of 4,977. Her DWT was 10,500.

Career
Empire Builder's port of registry was West Hartlepool. On completion, she was handed over to the Polish Government on 30 January 1942 and renamed Tobruk, after participation of Polish troops in defence of Tobruk. Her port of registry was changed to Gdynia. Tobruk was owned by the Polish government and operated under the management of Gdynia America Line, in charter of War Transport Administration.

PQ 13
Convoy PQ 13 departed Loch Ewe on 10 March 1942 and arrived at Murmansk, Soviet Union on 31 March having lost six ships to enemy action. A further two were sunk at Murmansk after the convoy's arrival. Tobruk was damaged by enemy bombing at Murmansk, repairs took about six months to complete. Crew members were joking later that the convoy departed on the 13th day of the month, the trip lasted 13 days, and Tobruk had the thirteenth position in the convoy.

QP 14
Convoy QP 14 departed Murmansk on 13 September 1942 and arrived at Loch Ewe on 26 September, having lost four ships to enemy action. Tobruk was carrying a cargo of Apatite. She departed Murmansk on 8 September bound for Archangelsk, from where she joined the convoy.

SL 178
Convoy SL 178 departed Freetown, Sierra Leone on 25 November 1944 and arrived at Liverpool on 15 December. Tobruk was on a voyage from Pepel to Barry, Glamorgan. She was carrying a cargo of iron ore and two passengers. On 9 December, a deceased seaman from Tobruk was buried at sea.

Postwar, Tobruk continued in Polish Government service. On 21 June 1946, the ship entered Gdynia in Poland for the first time. After disbanding of Gdynia Ameryka Line, from 1951 the Tobruk became part of Polish Ocean Lines fleet. In 1950 during a storm in the Bay of Biscay in order to prevent the ship from crashing into the local reefs the crew improvised a sail, saving the ship; this is the only known example of a modern bulk carrier using a sail. In June 1967 Tobruk was given to other Polish state-owned operator, Polska Żegluga Morska (Polsteam), but was stricken already in November 1967. She was scrapped at Gdynia by June 1968.

In popular culture
The wartime history of the ship has been portrayed in a novel S.S. Tobruk – w konwojach śmierci (SS Tobruk – in the convoys of death) by Jana Kazimierza Sawickiego.

References

1941 ships
Ships built on the River Tees
Empire ships
Ministry of War Transport ships
Steamships of the United Kingdom
World War II merchant ships of Poland
Steamships of Poland
Merchant ships of Poland
Maritime incidents in April 1942
Ships of the Gdynia-America Line